Lebanon First is the former parliamentary bloc of the Future Movement in the Lebanese Parliament. Headed by Saad Hariri, it consisted of 21 deputies after the 2018 general election. It is now disbanded and is succeeded by the Northern Parliamentary Gathering after Hariri's electoral boycott.

References 

Future Movement
March 14 Alliance
Parliamentary blocs of Lebanon